The Marine Corps League is the only congressionally chartered United States Marine Corps-related veterans organization in the United States.  Its congressional charter was approved by the 75th U.S. Congress and signed by President Franklin D. Roosevelt on August 4, 1937.  The organization credits Major General John A. Lejeune, the 13th Marine Corps commandant, as one of its founding members.

The League holds a congressional charter under Title 36 of the United States Code.

Mission statement

History
The Marine Corps League perpetuates the traditions and spirit of all Marines, Navy FMF corpsmen and Navy FMF chaplains who wear or have worn the Eagle, Globe and Anchor of the Marine Corps. The League is the only federally chartered Marine Corps-related veterans organization in the country. Since its earliest days, the League has enjoyed the support and encouragement of the active duty and reserve establishments of the Marine Corps. The League boasts a membership of more than 60,000 men and women, officer and enlisted, active duty, reserve Marines, honorably discharged Marine veterans, qualified Navy FMF corpsmen and qualified Navy FMF chaplains. It is one of the few veterans organizations that experiences annual membership increases.

Marine Corps Veterans Conference of 1922 (November 10, 1922) 
In 1922, retired Major Sidney W. Brewster had a vision in which appeared thousands of Marines marching in a parade. Until February 1923, his vision was an obsession until others with whom Brewster talked became impressed. From 1919-23, veteran organizations sprang up in all parts of the country. Clubs, associations and groups for Marine veterans were formed in keeping with the prevalent feeling of esprit de corps and good fellowship. They had served and fought together and now they met to recount the days of 1917-19 spent in Parris Island, Quantico, France and Germany.

A gathering convened on November 10, 1922 at the Hotel McAlpin in New York City to discuss establishing relationships with other Marine Corps veteran organizations. Among attendees were retired First Lt. Paul Howard, retired First Lt. James Duffy, Second Lt. Frank D'Ipoli, Albert Lages, Milton Solomon, Roy Hagan, Frank Lambert, Miss Ray Sawyer, Mrs. Mae Garner, Webster de S. Smith, Merle McAlister and Rev. J. H. Clifford. After lengthy discussion, Brewster's vision materialized and he was elected temporary chairman. Sawyer was elected temporary secretary and Raymond Wills was elected temporary treasurer.

A committee was appointed to plan a national organization and the name "Marine Corps Veterans Association" was adopted. The titles of officers were then changed to Commandant, Adjutant, Paymaster, etc.

Brewster was elected as commandant by acclamation, holding that position until the election of Major General John A. Lejeune at the second annual convention. Sawyer worked almost day and night during those early days to obtain a place for the new organization.

The Marine Corps Veterans Association began to organize posts across the country. The first New York post unanimously elected Colonel George C. Reid as post  commandant on December 11, 1922. Detachments began to organize in Philadelphia, Baltimore, Buffalo, Niagara Falls, Cleveland, Chicago, Indianapolis, Houston and Pittsburgh.

The New York post and the McLemore detachment are the only remaining units of the Marine Corps Veterans Association that predate the Marine Corps League.

The following list of units is arranged in order of first publication appearance in the Leatherneck Magazine (no organization or charter dates mentioned):

All-Marine Caucus of 1923 (June 3–6, 1923)
The Marine Corps League was organized at the All-Marine caucus held at the Hotel Pennsylvania in New York City from June 3–6, 1923. It was the offspring of the Marine Corps Veterans Association headed by Brewster, who presided at the caucus.

Marine Corps veterans from many states attended. LeJeune, Commandant of the Marine Corps at the time, was unable to be present, but was kept informed of the proceedings by telephone. Brigadier General James G. Harbord, U.S. Army, who commanded the Second Division, American Expeditionary Force (A.E.F.), which included the Fifth Marine Regiment and Sixth Marine Regiment, addressed the closing session and was made an honorary member. At the end of the caucus, the Marine Corps Veterans Association would change its name after a bitter battle on the floor to the "Marine Corps League."

Lejeune was unanimously elected to the position of national commandant and Brewster became the first past national commandant. An amendment to the constitution was also passed at this convention: "All Past National Commandants shall be members of the Staff for life, with vote, and shall also be life delegates to the National Assembly with vote."

Progression of the Marine Corps League

The New York detachment would be the first chartered at the "All Marine Caucus" under the national organization's new name as New York Detachment No. 1, thus making it the League's oldest continuous detachment. Colonel George C. Reid continued as the detachment commandant. After the conclusion of the caucus, other detachments began to organize. Buffalo, New York was the second and Newark, New Jersey the third. Other detachments quickly followed in the east and midwest. By 1928, detachments reached to the west coast. The second national convention was held in Washington, DC, the third in Philadelphia, the fourth in Cleveland and the fifth in Erie, Pennsylvania. LeJeune remained as national commandant until 1929, when Maj. Gen. Wendell C. Neville succeeded him as Marine Corps Commandant. LeJeune then appointed Neville as the National Commandant of the Marine Corps League for the duration of his term until the next national convention in St. Louis, MO in 1930. At the St. Louis convention, W. Karl Lations of Worcester, Massachusetts was elected the first civilian commandant of the League.

The League prospered and expanded under the leadership of Lations, who was national commandant until 1931, when the ninth national convention in Buffalo, New York elected Carlton A. Fisher of the Niagara-Frontier detachment to succeed Lations.

The Great Depression handicapped the League and other veteran and fraternal groups. In 1932, a movement was started in Washington under the guise of economy to abolish the Marine Corps. This was frustrated when New York Detachment No. 1 began a newspaper campaign of protest, followed by contact with every senator and congressman in the United States Congress by letter and personal visits, which ended the movement.

John F. Manning of Methuen, Massachusetts succeeded Fisher as national commandant at the convention in Denver, Colorado in 1934. Manning was succeeded by Maurice A. Illch of Albany, New York at the national convention in Boston, Massachusetts in 1936. During his administration, the "Corrigan Will" contest was settled, which enriched the national treasury by $10,000. On August 4, 1937, the League was chartered by Congress.

Florence E. O'Leary of Cincinnati, Ohio succeeded Illch as national commandant at the national convention in Washington, DC in 1938. He was succeeded by Chris J. Cunningham of Albany, New York at the national convention in Detroit in 1940. During Cunningham's tenure, League membership more than doubled, the number of detachments increased to more than 160 and the first monthly national bulletin was launched. Cunningham was succeeded by Judge Alexander F. Ormsby of Jersey City, New Jersey at the national convention in Chicago. Cunningham was succeeded by Thomas E. Wood at the national convention held in the New Yorker Hotel in September 1943.

Programs
The Marine Corps League supports various programs to promote and honor the spirit and traditions of the Marines:

Injured Marines
Marines Helping Marines—Wounded Marines Program: Supports injured Marines in the following 
Brooke Army Medical Center (San Antonio, Texas)
Walter Reed Army Medical Center (Washington, D.C.)
Naval Hospitals
National Naval Medical Center, Bethesda, Maryland
Naval Medical Center Portsmouth, Portsmouth, Virginia
Naval Medical Center San Diego (Balboa Naval Hospital)
Naval Hospital Camp Pendleton
Marine-4-Life/Injured Marine Support Program: Mentors and provides support for transitioning Marines.
National Marksmanship Program: keeping the heritage and tradition of elite marksmanship. This program promotes safe and responsible marksmanship across the nation. The Marine Corps League Shooting Team is a program within the MCLMP

Youth programs
Young Marines: A youth program emphasizing the core values of the Marine Corps.
U.S. Marines Youth Physical Fitness Program: For elementary and high school students.
Boy Scouts of America: One of the largest youth organizations in the United States.
Scholarship program: Provides academic scholarships to children of Marines and former Marines.
Toys for Tots: A program of the U.S. Marine Reserve.

Veterans benefits
Legislative program: Participates in national and state issues which impact the military and veterans programs.
Veterans Service Officer Program: Assist with claims resulting from active duty service.
Veterans Affairs Volunteer Service Program: Volunteer assistance in VA hospitals and clinics.

Miscellaneous
Military Order of the Devil Dogs: Fun and honor society of the MCL.

Publication
Initially, the official bulletin of the League was the Leatherneck magazine, which carried League news in every issue and had a circulation of over 5,200. Through the magazine and the recruiting services of the Marine Corps, information about the League's activities was disseminated with the hope of building the Marine Corps Reserve to an appreciable size.

Eventually, the League would produce its own official publication, Semper Fi magazine, but the League is allowed to contribute articles to Leatherneck magazine. Semper Fi magazine is published on a quarterly basis.

Organization
The Marine Corps League is headed by an elected National Commandant, with 14 elected national staff officers who serve as trustees. The National Board of Trustees coordinates the efforts of 48 department, or state, entities and the activities of over 1,000 community-based detachments located throughout the United States and overseas. The day-to-day operations of the League are under the control of the National Executive Director/Chief Operating Officer, with the responsibility for the management and direction of all programs, activities and affairs as well the supervision of the national headquarters staff.

National
The prime authority of the League is derived from its congressional charter and from its annual national convention held each August in a different major U.S. city. It is a not-for-profit organization within the provisions of the Internal Revenue Service Code 501(c) (4). A special group exemption letter allows contributions to the Marine Corps League, its auxiliary and subsidiary units to be tax deductible by the donor.

Divisions
For more effective administration, the United States is divided into geographical units called divisions whose function is solely administrative. The duties and authority of the national vice commandants of divisions are covered in the national bylaws. The divisions of the Marine Corps League are:

(1) Central Division - Michigan, Ohio, Indiana, Illinois, Wisconsin, Kentucky
(2) Mideast Division - Virginia, West Virginia, North Carolina, Delaware, Maryland, District of Columbia, Virgin Islands, Puerto Rico, Saudi Arabia, United Kingdom
(3) Midwest Division - Missouri, Iowa, Kansas, Minnesota, Nebraska, North Dakota, South Dakota
(4) New England Division - Maine, New Hampshire, Vermont, Massachusetts, Connecticut, Rhode Island
(5) Northeast Division - New Jersey, New York, Pennsylvania
(6) Northwest Division - Alaska, Washington, Montana, Oregon, Idaho
(7)  Rocky Mountain Division - Colorado, Utah, New Mexico, Wyoming
(8) Southeast Division - Alabama, Florida, Georgia, South Carolina, Mississippi, Louisiana, Tennessee
(9) Southern Division - Oklahoma, Texas, Arkansas
(10) Southwest Division - Arizona, California, Nevada, Hawaii

Departments
A State in which there are three or more Detachments with a combined membership of sixty (60) or more members may be chartered as a Department by the National Board of Trustees upon receiving a written request from such Detachments via the jurisdictional National Division Vice Commandant.

Area
The function of an Area is administrative only and is formed at the discretion of the Department. The Area Vice Commandant will be responsible for the Area.

Detachments
The Detachment is the basic unit of the League and usually represents a small geographic area such as a single town or part of a county. There are over 1000 community-based Detachments located throughout the United States and overseas, supporting veterans and their families while being active and involved in the local community. The Detachment is used for formal business such as meetings and a coordination point for community service projects. A Detachment member is distinguished by a Red garrison cap with gold piping.

Notable members
 Sidney W. Brewster
 Rev. John H. Clifford
 James G. Harbord
 Frank X. Lambert
John A. Lejeune
 Ray C. Sawyer
 Milton Solomon

List of Past National Commandants and Convention Sites

Deceased

List of Honorary Past National Commandants Of The Marine Corps League

Deceased

List of Military Order Of Devil Dogs (Founded 1939 Boston, Massachusetts)

Deceased
D who served as KDR

See also

Museum of the Marine

References

External links
Marine Corps League, National Headquarters Website

Organizations associated with the United States Marine Corps
Patriotic and national organizations chartered by the United States Congress
American veterans' organizations